Carlos Roberto Bernárdez García (born 28 December 1992) is a Belizean footballer who plays as a forward for Honduran club Platense FC and the Belize national team.

Early life
Bernárdez comes from a Honduran family, but he was born in Belize while his parents were en route to the United States. At eight months old, his mother left him in Olanchito, the town where his family lived.

International career
As Bernárdez was raised in Honduras and identifies himself as a Honduran, his intention was to play for the Honduras national team. He ultimately accepted a call-up to represent Belize in 2019, and made his debut on 30 August 2019 in a friendly against Saint Vincent and the Grenadines.

Career statistics

International goals
Scores and results list Belize's goal tally first.

References

External links
 

1992 births
Living people
People from Belize City
Belizean footballers
Association football forwards
Belize international footballers
Belizean people of Honduran descent
People with acquired Honduran citizenship
Honduran footballers
C.D. Victoria players
C.D.S. Vida players
Platense F.C. players
Liga Nacional de Fútbol Profesional de Honduras players
Honduran Liga Nacional de Ascenso players